Viking Air Ltd. is an operator and manufacturer of aircraft, as well as aircraft parts and systems, based at Victoria International Airport in North Saanich, British Columbia, Canada. The company produces new versions of the DHC-6 Twin Otter, upgraded versions of the DHC-2 Beaver, spare parts for older de Havilland Canada aircraft, and components for Bell Helicopter Textron. The company also plans to produce its new DHC-515 (formerly CL-515) water bomber firefighting aircraft in Calgary, Alberta.

Its president and CEO from 1991 is David Curtis, who has announced his intention to retire, as of August 2021. The company is managed by Longview Aviation Capital.
Longview Aviation is owned by Sherry Brydson, granddaughter of deceased newspaper magnate Roy Thomson and cousin of David Thomson, parties of the largest family fortune in Canada.

History 

The company was established in 1970 by founder, Norwegian-born Canadian aviation pioneer Nils Christensen, doing overhaul, maintenance and conversions to all types of aircraft but specializing in flying boats.  In 1983, Christensen acquired the exclusive rights from de Havilland Canada to manufacture spare parts and to distribute the DHC-2 Beaver and the DHC-3 Otter aircraft.  He retired as president of Viking Air in 1987.

Acquisitions

Acquisition of de Havilland Canada designs: DHC-1 through DHC-7
In May 2005, the company subsequently purchased the parts and service business for all the older de Havilland Canada aircraft from Bombardier Aerospace.
On 24 February 2006, Viking purchased the type certificates from Bombardier for all the discontinued de Havilland Canada designs: the DHC-1 Chipmunk, DHC-2 Beaver, DHC-3 Otter, DHC-4 Caribou, DHC-5 Buffalo, DHC-6 Twin Otter and DHC-7 Dash 7, giving Viking Air the right to manufacture new aircraft if a market should arise for such.

Restart of DHC production

On 2 April 2007, Viking announced that, nineteen years after being discontinued, with 27 orders and options in hand, it was restarting production of the Twin Otter with more powerful Pratt & Whitney Canada PT6A-34/35 engines. The first flight of the Series 400 technical demonstrator took place on 1 October 2008 at Victoria International Airport. In February 2010 the first new production Twin Otter Series 400 equipped with Honeywell's Primus Apex IFR digital flight deck and configured with a commuter interior took its first flight. The DHC-6-400 series Twin Otter design has all around better performance, it includes more power, space, and now can haul up to 4,280 lbs of freight.

Viking Air also produces upgraded DHC-2 Beavers fitted with a Pratt & Whitney Canada PT6A-34 turboprop engine called the DHC-2T Turbo Beaver.

In December 2008, Viking Air indicated their intention to put the DHC-5 Buffalo series back into production in Canada at their home factory in North Saanich or in Calgary, Alberta. A potential new production Buffalo would have had Pratt & Whitney Canada PW150 turboprops, a glass cockpit, enhanced vision and night vision goggle capability. The company proposed the aircraft as a replacement for the Royal Canadian Air Force fleet of existing DHC-5As but the aircraft was not included in the final assessment in 2016 which chose the EADS CASA C-295.

In September 2017, Viking Air announced that it would begin talking to potential customers interested in the CL-415 "SuperScooper" Waterbomber aircraft, with the potential of the company reviving production of the aircraft if it finds demand.

On March 31, 2022, De Havilland Canada Ltd. (under Viking Air) announced plans for the DHC-515 Firefighter Program. Formerly known as the CL-515 program, the new water bomber aircraft builds upon the iconic CL-215 and CL-415 firefighting aircraft with modern features and improvements. Production and final assembly are to occur in Calgary, Alberta, where support for existing in-service CL-215 and CL-415 aircraft takes place. The company has signed letters of intent for the purchase of the first 22 DHC-515 aircraft by European customers. The program is expected to bring 500 jobs to Calgary.

Further type certificate acquisitions

In 2006, Viking Air acquired the type certificate for the Trident TR-1 Trigull since 2006, along with the three prototypes built. On 20 June 2016, Viking announced the acquisition of the worldwide amphibious aircraft program from Bombardier, including the type certificate for the CL-215, CL-215T and CL-415 Waterbombers. The acquisition was finalized on 3 October.
On 29 May 2018, five CL-415 were sold to US firefighting company Bridger Aerospace, Longview then expected to recruit 200 workers in Calgary for the conversions.

Dash-8 acquisition

On 8 November 2018, Viking Air parent Longview Aviation acquired the Bombardier Dash 8 program and the de Havilland brand from Bombardier to continue Q400 production, in Downsview until the lease ends in 2021, in a deal that closed in the second half of 2019, bringing together all of the DHC type certificates under one umbrella once again.
Bombardier announced the sale was for $300 million, and expects $250 million net.
After the deal, Longview will have $1 billion (US$670 million) in annual sales and 1,800 workers in Victoria, Calgary and Toronto.
By November 2018 the sales of the higher-performance Q400 were slower than the cheaper aircraft from competitor ATR.

In January 2019, parent company Longview announced that it would establish a new company in Ontario, under the De Havilland Aircraft Company of Canada name, to continue production of the Bombardier Dash 8 line.
The Dash 8 acquisition will vault Longview from 600–700 employees to up to 2,000 including the CL-415 new production.
After Bombardier sold the Q400 plant in Downsview, Ontario, Longview has three years to find a new location in Ontario where production should stay with 1,000 people.

In February 2022, Longview consolidated its activities, with Viking Air, Longview Aviation, Pacific Sky Training and De Havilland Canada all being rebranded as De Havilland Aircraft of Canada.

Products 
 DHC-2T Turbo Beaver — remanufactured Beavers by Viking Air, upgraded with a Pratt & Whitney Canada PT6A-34 680 hp (507 kW) turboprop engine.
 DHC-6 Twin Otter Series 400 (new production) — first delivered in July 2010, powered by two Pratt & Whitney Canada PT6A-34 or optional PT6A-35 Hot & High Performance engines, and available on standard landing gear, straight floats, amphibious floats, skis, wheel skis, or intermediate flotation landing gear.
 CL-415 Enhanced Aerial Firefighter (EAF) — remanufactured CL-215 Scoopers, featuring Pratt & Whitney Canada PW123AF turboprop engines and EFIS avionics suite.

List of type certificates

 DHC-1 Chipmunk
 DHC-2 Beaver
 DHC-3 Otter
 DHC-4 Caribou 
 DHC-5 Buffalo 
 DHC-6 Twin Otter
 DHC-7 Dash 7
 DHC-8 Dash 8 (under parent company Longview Aviation)
 CL-215
 CL-215T
 CL-415
 Short Skyvan
 Short 330 
 Short 360
 Trident TR-1 Trigull

Proposals 
 DHC-5NG Buffalo NG — Proposed redesigned new production version to be built by Viking Air. NG is the company's marketing term indicating Next Generation.

Fleet
As of February 2023, Viking Air has the following aircraft listed with Transport Canada and operate as ICAO airline designator VKN, and telephony TRUE NORTH.

See also

 Bombardier Aerospace
 COM DEV International
 CMC Electronics
 Héroux-Devtek
 List of STOL aircraft
 MacDonald, Dettwiler and Associates
 Spar Aerospace

References

External links
 
 Company Profile at Industry Canada
 "Victoria-built planes fly around the globe", Times-Colonist, 6 December 2011

External reading
  Sean Rossiter The Immortal Beaver: The World's Greatest Bush Plane , Douglas & McIntyre, 2005 ,

Aircraft manufacturers of Canada
Multinational aircraft manufacturers
Aerospace companies of Canada
Manufacturing companies established in 1970
Emergency services equipment makers
Canadian brands
De Havilland Canada
1970 establishments in British Columbia
Canadian companies established in 1970
Thomson family